Ormond Henry Jones (24 August 1910 – 10 April 1972) was a Welsh footballer who played as a goalkeeper for Wednesbury Town, Stoke City, Yeovil & Petters United, Port Vale, Watford, and Mansfield Town.

Career
Jones played for Hickman's Town, Bilston United, Wednesbury Town, Stoke City (on trial in March 1931), Blackpool (on trial) and Yeovil & Petters United, before joining Port Vale in May 1933. He was appointed first team keeper ahead of Allan Todd until October 1933, when he contracted tonsillitis and lost his place. He played a total of 14 Second Division games in the 1933–34 season. He was given a free transfer away from The Old Recreation Ground in May 1934 and later had two spells with Norwich City. He signed with Watford in January 1936 following injuries to Jim McLaren and John McHugh, and played eight Third Division South games before he was released at the end of the 1935–36 season. He later played for Mansfield Town and Yarmouth Town.

Career statistics
Source:

References

Sportspeople from Conwy County Borough
Welsh footballers
Association football goalkeepers
Wednesbury Town F.C. players
Stoke City F.C. players
Yeovil Town F.C. players
Port Vale F.C. players
Norwich City F.C. players
Watford F.C. players
Mansfield Town F.C. players
English Football League players
1910 births
1972 deaths